Foliglurax (developmental code names PXT-002331, DT2331) is a positive allosteric modulator of the metabotropic glutamate receptor 4 (mGluR4), which is under development by Prexton Therapeutics for the treatment of Parkinson's disease. It reached phase II clinical trials, but while it was found to be safe and showed some signs of clinical improvement, it failed to sufficiently distinguish itself from placebo to meet the study endpoints.

References 

Benzopyrans
Experimental drugs
MGlu4 receptor agonists
4-Morpholinyl compunds
Nitroso compounds
Thienopyridines